A partial solar eclipse will occur on Thursday, March 21, 2080.

Related eclipses

Solar eclipses 2080–2083

References

External links 

2080 in science
2080 3 21
2080 3 21